Lloyd Kahn (born April 28, 1935) is an American publisher, editor, author, photographer, carpenter, and self-taught architect. He is the founding editor-in-chief of Shelter Publications, Inc., and is the former Shelter editor of the Whole Earth Catalog. He is a pioneer of the green building and green architecture movements. His book Shelter (1973) about DIY architecture, has sold more than 250,000 copies.

He lives and works in Bolinas, Marin County, California.

Early life 
Kahn became interested in construction at age 12 when working on his family's house in Central Valley. He earned a B.A. degree (1957) from Stanford University.

During the late 1950s, while serving in the United States Air Force in Germany, Kahn ran the USAF newspaper for two years. He returned to California in 1960 to work as an insurance broker and in 1965 quit his insurance job and began work as a carpenter, eventually building four houses.

Career in carpentry and construction
Kahn's first project was a sod-roof studio in Mill Valley, with succulents planted on the roof. The second project was a used-wood, timber-frame Japanese and Bernard Maybeck-influenced design: a post-and-beam frame, with several -high poured concrete walls.

Before these two jobs, he'd had little building experience, but quickly learned on the job. This is where he discovered the owner/builder perspective in learning to build. He tried to maintain this outlook throughout his publishing career, so he could explain building techniques to novice builders. He next got a job in Big Sur as foreman building a large post and beam house out of bridge timbers from a dismantled bridge; the main structural members were 30' long, 8' X 22" redwood beams. He then built his own home out of used lumber and hand-split shakes in Big Sur, developed a water supply, and terraced a hillside for small-scale farming.

Influenced by Buckminster Fuller, in 1968 he started building geodesic domes. This resulted in a job coordinating with Jay Baldwin the building of 17 domes at Pacific High School, an alternative school in the Santa Cruz mountains. Experimenting with geodesic domes made from plywood, aluminum, sprayed foam, and vinyl, the children built their own domes and lived in them. Jay Baldwin built a dome covered with vinyl pillows. When Buckminster Fuller visited the school in 1970, he commissioned Baldwin to build a replica of the dome on his property in Maine. The school received media attention.

Work in editing and publishing
Kahn next worked for Stewart Brand as Shelter editor for the Whole Earth Catalog. In 1970 Kahn published his first book, Domebook One, followed the next year with Domebook 2, which sold 165,000 copies. In 1971, he bought a half-acre lot in Bolinas, California, and built a shake-covered geodesic dome (later featured in Life magazine). After living in his dome for a year, Kahn decided domes did not work well: he stopped the printing of Domebook 2 and disassembled and sold his dome. He then went in search of other (non-dome) ways to build – across the U.S.A., Ireland, and England, and the book Shelter (1973) was the result.

During the next two decades, Shelter Publications produced a series of fitness books, including Bob Anderson's Stretching (which has sold three million copies and is in 31 languages), Galloway's Book on Running by Olympian Jeff Galloway, and Getting Stronger by legendary bodybuilder Bill Pearl. From 1997 to 2015, Shelter Publishing also produced StretchWare, software by Bob Anderson that reminds you to stretch at your computer.

In 2004, Kahn published Home Work: Handbuilt Shelter. Home Work summarizes the best of his work over the past 30 years photographing buildings and interviewing builders, and includes numerous buildings directly inspired by the book Shelter. The Septic Systems Owner's Manual, first published in 2000, was extensively revised in 2007. In 2008 Shelter Publications published the first English translation of Brazilian architect Johan van Lengen's The Barefoot Architect: A Manual on Green Building. Also in 2008, Kahn authored Builders of the Pacific Coast. Kahn authored a photo book about tiny houses, titled Tiny Homes: Simple Shelter published January 2012. Kahn's newest book is Tiny Homes on the Move published in April, 2014.

In keeping with his fitness theme, Kahn, at the age of 76, continued to surf, paddle board, and skateboard (longboard).

Photography 
In 2016, Kahn had a solo exhibition of his photography, Lloyd Kahn: Driftwood Shelters, curated by Jennifer Gately at the Bolinas Museum.

Publications

As author

As editor

As publisher 
Stretching (publisher, 1980)
Galloway's Book on Running (publisher, 1984)
Getting Stronger (publisher, 1985)
Getting in Shape (publisher, 1995)
Marathon: You Can Do It! (publisher, 2001)

See also 
 Mickey Muennig

References

External links 
Lloyd's Blog
https://www.shelterpub.com/
Whole Earth Catalog

Living people
1935 births
American male writers
Stanford University alumni
American publishers (people)
DIY culture
Photographers from California